Öggestorp Church is a church building in Öggestorp, Sweden. It belongs  to the  Rogberga-Öggestorp Parish  within the Diocese of Växjö in the Church of Sweden. 
The church  was opened on 18 August 1883 replacing the old church, which was demolished in 1882. Over the years, the church has undergone several renovations, the last during 1996–1997.
The pulpit was carved in 1681. The altarpiece is probably a work from the mid-18th century. The  sandstone baptismal font dates to the medieval era.

References

External links

19th-century Church of Sweden church buildings
Churches in Jönköping Municipality
Churches completed in 1883
Churches in the Diocese of Växjö